Juan Pablo Sutina Bustamante (born February 2, 1990) is an Argentine-Spanish basketball player, who plays the shooting guard position for the Spanish club CD Estela.

External links
 FEB profile

1990 births
Living people
Argentine men's basketball players
Força Lleida CE players
Shooting guards
Spanish men's basketball players
Argentine emigrants to Spain
Basketball players from Buenos Aires